Billy, Bill, Will or William Reynolds may refer to:

Entertainment industry figures
William Reynolds (actor) (1931–2022), American film and TV second lead
William Reynolds (film editor) (1910–1997), American winner of two Academy Awards
Bill Reynolds (producer), American rock musician and songwriter active since 2002

Industrialists
William Reynolds (industrialist) (1758–1803), English ironmaster, built Ketley Canal
William Bainbridge Reynolds (1855–1935), English metal craftsman and engineer
William Neal Reynolds (1863–1951), American tobacco manufacturer

Military men
William Reynolds (naval officer) (1815–1879), Union Navy admiral in American Civil War
William Reynolds (VC) (1827–1869), Scottish private who received Victoria Cross
William E. Reynolds (1860–1944), United States Coast Guard commandant

Politicians
William Reynolds (New Zealand politician) (1822–1899), New Zealand politician and businessman
William H. Reynolds (New York politician), American real estate developer and New York state senator
William Hayden Reynolds (1847–1935), American mayor of Orlando, Florida 1910–1913
William James Reynolds (1856–1934), Irish nationalist politician and MP for East Tyrone, 1885–1895
William George Waterhouse Reynolds, English Member of Parliament for Leicester South in 1922–23

Scholars 
William Reynolds (theologian) (1544–1594), English Catholic biblical translator and scholar a/k/a Reginaldus
William Craig Reynolds (1933–2004), American engineer and physicist
William D. Reynolds (1867–1951), American Southern Presbyterian missionary and Bible translator in Korea
William Morton Reynolds (1812–1876), American minister, college president and translator

Sportsmen

American football
William Ayres Reynolds (1874–1928), American college player and coach of football and baseball
Billy Reynolds (American football) (1931–2002), American halfback in NFL and AFL

Baseball
Bill Reynolds (catcher) (1884–1924), American catcher for New York Yankees
Bill Reynolds (Negro leagues) (born 1929), American Negro leagues baseball player

Football
William Reynolds (footballer, born 1870) (1870–after 1893), English left back
William Reynolds (footballer, born 1879) (1879–1973), English forward
Billy Reynolds (footballer) (1864–after 1892), English centre-forward

Auto racing
Bill Reynolds, Australian driver in 1963 Armstrong 500

Others
Will Reynolds (c.1867–1902), American mass shooter of nine victims in Alabama
William Bradford Reynolds (1942–2019), American lawyer; Assistant Attorney General 1981–88

Characters
Bill Reynolds (Tea and Sympathy) in Robert Anderson's 1953 American play
Bill Reynolds (The Passage) in 2012–16 series of American novels by Justin Cronin
Bill Reynolds (Love Thy Neighbour) in 1972–76 British sitcom

See also
 Reynolds-Morris House, in Philadelphia, Pennsylvania, built in 1786–87 by John and William Reynolds
William F. Raynolds (1820–1894), American army officer and explorer
Bill Rennells (born 1931), English journalist and radio broadcaster